Perdutamente tuo... mi firmo Macaluso Carmelo fu Giuseppe (Italian for "Desperately yours ... I sign Macaluso Carmelo late  Giuseppe") is a 1976 satirical comedy film written and directed by Vittorio Sindoni and starring Stefano Satta Flores and Macha Méril.

Plot

Cast 
Stefano Satta Flores as Carmelo Macaluso
Macha Méril as Baroness Valeria Lamia
Leopoldo Trieste as Don Calogero Liotti
Cinzia Monreale as Jessica
Luciano Salce as Baron Alfonso Lamia
Umberto Orsini as Lawyer Vito Orsini
Marisa Laurito as Tindara Liotti 
Pino Ferrara as Defense Attorney
 Deddi Savagnone as Don Calogero's Wife
Roberto Della Casa as Bank Teller

See also    
 List of Italian films of 1976

References

External links

Italian comedy films
Italian satirical films
1976 comedy films
1976 films
Films directed by Vittorio Sindoni
1970s Italian films